Sergey Nikolayevich Rogozhin (6 July 1956 – 31 May 1983) was a Soviet equestrian and Olympic champion. He won a team gold medal in eventing at the 1980 Summer Olympics in Moscow.

References

1956 births
1983 deaths
Russian male equestrians
Soviet male equestrians
Olympic equestrians of the Soviet Union
Equestrians at the 1980 Summer Olympics
Olympic gold medalists for the Soviet Union
Event riders
Olympic medalists in equestrian
Medalists at the 1980 Summer Olympics